1V may refer to:

Wind Jet's IATA code
Canon EOS-1v
SSH 1V (WA); see Washington State Route 509
UH-1V; see Bell UH-1 Iroquois variants
Mil-17-1V, a model of Mil Mi-17
APR-1V, a model of Angkut Personel Ringan by Pindad
1V (V-67), manufacturer's designation for Venera 4
First Volition (or Confident Volition) in the psychosophy typology

See also
Volt
V1 (disambiguation)